Mantua Cathedral in Mantua, Lombardy, northern Italy, is a Roman Catholic cathedral dedicated to Saint Peter. It is the seat of the Bishop of Mantua.

History

An initial structure probably existed on the site in the Early Christian era, which was followed by a building destroyed by a fire in 894. The current church was rebuilt in 1395–1401 with the addition of side chapels and a Gothic west front, which can still be seen in a sketch by Domenico Morone (preserved in the Palazzo Ducale of Mantua). The bell tower has seven bells tuned in the scale of Bb. The organ of the cathedral was built by Hans Tugi in c. 1503.

After another fire in the 16th century, Giulio Romano rebuilt the interior but saved the frontage, which was replaced however in 1756–61 by the current Baroque one in Carrara marble. Notable characteristics of the Renaissance structure are the cusps, decorated with rose windows on the south side, which end at the Romanesque bell tower.

Musicians
Rossino Mantovano (fl. 1505–1511), maestro di canto at the Mantua Cathedral in 1510-1511
Ruggier Trofeo (c. 1550-1614), organist at the Mantua Cathedral in 1576-1577
Ippolito Baccusi  (c. 1550 – 1609), mastro di cappella at the Mantua Cathedral from 1583-1591
Lodovico Grossi da Viadana (c. 1560 – 1627), mastro di cappella at the Mantua Cathedral from 1594-1596

Interior artworks 
 The Trinity with the Virgin, Saint John and angels by Antonio Maria Viani (fresco in apse)
 Saint Margaret (1552) by Domenico Brusasorci (canvas in Chapel of the Sacrament)
 Saint Martin dividing his cloak with the beggar (1552) by Paolo Farinati
Glory of Saint Joseph (1616) by Niccolò Ricciolini
Saint Dominic by Bernardino Malpizzi
Madonna dell'Itria by Antonio Maria Viani
Saint Aloysius Gonzaga by Ippolito Andreasi

Burials
Ludovico I Gonzaga
Ludovico III Gonzaga, Marquis of Mantua

See also
 History of early modern period domes

Sources

Roman Catholic cathedrals in Italy
Cathedral
Cathedrals in Lombardy
Gothic architecture in Mantua
Cathedral